PS Premier was a British paddle steamer that was noted for her longevity. She was built in Scotland in 1846, spent much of her career on the south coast of England and was scrapped in 1938.

Building
William Denny and Brothers built Premier on the River Leven at Dumbarton in 1846. She had an iron hull and her paddles were driven by a 55 RHP engine made by a company called Steeple. The ship was registered on 5 February 1847.

Career
Premier spent her first few years on the Firth of Clyde. The Dumbarton Steamboat Co operated her until 1852, when a J Tizard acquired her and re-registered her at Weymouth, Dorset.

Cosens & Co Ltd, who operated pleasure steamers from Weymouth, acquired Premier in 1860 Cosens rebuilt her in 1878 by inserting a new  section amidships and replacing her original engine with a two-cylinder 50 RHP oscillating steam engine made by John Penn and Sons of Blackheath.

In 1890 a George E Elliot acquired Premier. But at some date she passed back to Cosens, whom Lloyd's Register records as her owner in 1930. The last Lloyd's Register in which she appears is for 1931. She was scrapped in 1938.

References

1846 ships
Paddle steamers of the United Kingdom
Ships built in Scotland